This listing contains taxa of plants in the division Marchantiophyta, recorded from South Africa. The Marchantiophyta  are a division of non-vascular land plants commonly referred to as hepatics or liverworts. Like mosses and hornworts, they have a gametophyte-dominant life cycle, in which cells of the plant carry only a single set of genetic information.

It is estimated that there are about 9000 species of liverworts. Some of the more familiar species grow as a flattened leafless thallus, but most species are leafy with a form very much like a flattened moss.  Leafy species can be distinguished from the apparently similar mosses on the basis of a number of features, including their single-celled rhizoids. Leafy liverworts also differ from most (but not all) mosses in that their leaves never have a costa (present in many mosses) and may bear marginal cilia (very rare in mosses). Other differences are not universal for all mosses and liverworts, but the occurrence of leaves arranged in three ranks, the presence of deep lobes or segmented leaves, or a lack of clearly differentiated stem and leaves all point to the plant being a liverwort.

Liverworts are typically small, usually from 2–20 mm wide with individual plants less than 10 cm long, and are therefore often overlooked.  However, certain species may cover large patches of ground, rocks, trees or any other reasonably firm substrate on which they occur. They are distributed globally in almost every available habitat, most often in humid locations although there are desert and Arctic species as well.

23,420 species of vascular plant have been recorded in South Africa, making it the sixth most species-rich country in the world and the most species-rich country on the African continent. Of these, 153 species are considered to be threatened. Nine biomes have been described in South Africa: Fynbos, Succulent Karoo, desert, Nama Karoo, grassland, savanna, Albany thickets, the Indian Ocean coastal belt, and forests.

The 2018 South African National Biodiversity Institute's National Biodiversity Assessment plant checklist lists 35,130 taxa in the phyla Anthocerotophyta (hornworts (6)), Anthophyta (flowering plants(33534)), Bryophyta (mosses (685)), Cycadophyta (cycads (42)), Lycopodiophyta (Lycophytes(45)), Marchantiophyta (liverworts (376)), Pinophyta (conifers (33)), and Pteridophyta (cryptograms(408)).

Listing
Acanthocoleus aberrans (Lindenb. & Gottsche) Kruijt, indigenous
Acanthocoleus aberrans (Lindenb. & Gottsche) Kruijt var. laevis Gradst. indigenous
Acanthocoleus chrysophyllus (Lehm.) Kruijt, indigenous
Acanthocoleus madagascariensis (Steph.) Kruijt, indigenous
Acrobolbus excisus (Mitt.) Schiffn. synonym
Acrobolbus ochrophyllus (Hook.f. & Taylor) R.M.Schust. indigenous
Acromastigum exile (Lindenb.) A.Evans, endemic
Adelanthus decipiens (Hook.) Mitt. indigenous
Adelanthus lindenbergianus (Lehm.) Mitt. indigenous
Alobiella heteromorpha (Lehm.) Steph. Synonym
Alobiella pillansii (Sim) S.W.Arnell, Synonym
Alobiellopsis heteromorpha (Lehm.) R.M.Schust. indigenous
Alobiellopsis pillansii (Sim) R.M.Schust. endemic
Anastrophyllum auritum (Lehm.) Steph. indigenous
Anastrophyllum minutum (Schreb.) R.M.Schust. indigenous
Aneura pinguis (L.) Dumort. indigenous
Aphanolejeunea capensis (S.W.Arnell) S.W.Arnell, indigenous
Arachniopsis diacantha (Mont.) M.Howe, indigenous
Archilejeunea elobulata Steph. indigenous
Asterella abyssinica (Gottsche) Grolle, indigenous
Asterella bachmannii (Steph.) S.W.Arnell, indigenous
Asterella marginata (Nees) S.W.Arnell, endemic
Asterella muscicola (Steph.) S.W.Arnell, indigenous
Asterella wilmsii (Steph.) S.W.Arnell, indigenous
Athalamia spathysii (Lindenb.) S.Hatt. indigenous
Bazzania borbonica (Steph.) Steph. synonym
Bazzania decrescens (Lehm. & Lindenb.) Trevis. indigenous
Bazzania nitida (F.Weber) Grolle, indigenous
Bazzania praerupta (Reinw., Blume & Nees) Trevis. indigenous
Brachiolejeunea phyllorhiza (Nees) Kruijt & Gradst. indigenous
Calypogeia arguta Nees & Mont. indigenous
Calypogeia bidentula (F.Weber) Nees, indigenous
Calypogeia fissa (L.) Raddi, indigenous
Calypogeia fusca (Lehm.) Steph. synonym
Calypogeia longifolia Steph. indigenous
Calypogeia microstipula (Steph.) Steph. indigenous
Caudalejeunea africana (Steph.) Steph. indigenous
Caudalejeunea hanningtonii (Mitt.) Schiffn. indigenous
Cephalozia bicuspidata (L.) Dumort. indigenous
Cephalozia connivens (Dicks.) Lindb. indigenous
Cephalozia connivens (Dicks.) Lindb. subsp. fissa (Steph.) Vana, indigenous
Cephalozia fissa Steph. synonym
Cephaloziella anthelioides S.W.Arnell, endemic
Cephaloziella capensis (Sim) S.W.Arnell, endemic
Cephaloziella garsidei S.W.Arnell, indigenous
Cephaloziella kiaerii (Austin) Douin, indigenous
Cephaloziella lycopodioides (Sim) S.W.Arnell, endemic
Cephaloziella natalensis (Sim) S.W.Arnell, endemic
Cephaloziella schelpei S.W.Arnell, endemic
Cephaloziella tabularis S.W.Arnell, endemic
Cephaloziella tenuissima (Lehm. & Lindenb.) Steph. indigenous
Cephaloziella transvaalensis S.W.Arnell, indigenous
Cephaloziella triplicata S.W.Arnell, endemic
Chandonanthus hirtellus (F.Weber) Mitt. synonym
Cheilolejeunea convexa (S.W.Arnell) S.W.Arnell, endemic
Cheilolejeunea inflata Steph. synonym
Cheilolejeunea intertexta (Lindenb.) Steph. indigenous
Cheilolejeunea krakakammae (Lindenb.) R.M.Schust. indigenous
Cheilolejeunea pluriplicata (Pearson) R.M.Schust. indigenous
Cheilolejeunea pocsii E.W.Jones, indigenous
Cheilolejeunea rufescens (Lindenb.) Grolle, indigenous
Chiloscyphus muricatus (Lehm.) J.J.Engel & R.M.Schust. synonym
Clasmatocolea fasciculata (Nees) Grolle, endemic
Clasmatocolea vermicularis (Lehm.) Grolle, indigenous
Cololejeunea cardiocarpa (Mont.) A.Evans, indigenous
Cololejeunea dissita E.W.Jones, synonym
Cololejeunea minutissima (Sm.) Schiffn. indigenous
Cololejeunea minutissima (Sm.) Schiffn. subsp. minutissima, indigenous
Cololejeunea minutissima (Sm.) Schiffn. subsp. myriocarpa (Nees & Mont.) R.M.Schust. indigenous
Cololejeunea mocambiquensis S.W.Arnell, indigenous
Cololejeunea myriantha (Herzog) S.W.Arnell, synonym
Cololejeunea occidentalis (E.W.Jones) Vanden Berghen, indigenous
Cololejeunea oleana Sim, endemic
Colura calyptrifolia (Hook.) Dumort. indigenous
Colura tenuicornis (A.Evans) Steph. indigenous
Cryptochila grandiflora (Lindenb. & Gottsche) Grolle, indigenous
Cylindrocolea atroviridis (Sim) Vana, indigenous
Dicranolejeunea chrysophylla (Lehm.) Grolle, indigenous
Dicranolejeunea madagascariensis Steph. synonym
Dicranolejeunea phyllorhiza (Nees) Schiffn. synonym
Diplasiolejeunea cavifolia Steph. synonym
Diplasiolejeunea kraussiana (Lindenb.) Steph. indigenous
Drepanolejeunea hamatifolia (Hook.) Schiffn. indigenous
Drepanolejeunea papillosa S.W.Arnell, endemic
Drepanolejeunea physaefolia (Gottsche) Steph. indigenous
Drepanolejeunea vesiculosa (Mitt.) Steph. synonym
Dumortiera hirsuta (Sw.) Nees, indigenous
Exormotheca holstii Steph. indigenous
Exormotheca megastomata Marquand, synonym
Exormotheca pustulosa Mitt. indigenous
Fossombronia capensis S.W.Arnell, indigenous
Fossombronia capensis S.W.Arnell var. capensis, endemic
Fossombronia capensis S.W.Arnell var. spiralis Perold, endemic
Fossombronia cederbergensis Perold, endemic
Fossombronia crispa Nees, indigenous
Fossombronia densilamellata S.W.Arnell, endemic
Fossombronia elsieae Perold, endemic
Fossombronia gemmifera Perold, indigenous
Fossombronia glenii Perold, indigenous
Fossombronia hyalorhiza Perold, endemic
Fossombronia leucoxantha Lehm. endemic
Fossombronia marindae Perold, endemic
Fossombronia montaguensis S.W.Arnell, endemic
Fossombronia monticola Perold, endemic
Fossombronia renateae Perold, endemic
Fossombronia spinifolia Steph. endemic
Fossombronia spinosa Perold, endemic
Fossombronia straussiana Perold, indigenous
Fossombronia swaziensis Perold, indigenous
Fossombronia tumida Mitt. endemic
Fossombronia zeyheri Steph. synonym
Fossombronia zuurbergensis Perold, endemic
Frullania anderssonii Angstr. indigenous
Frullania arecae (Spreng.) Gottsche, indigenous
Frullania brunnea (Spreng.) Gottsche, Lindenb. & Nees, indigenous
Frullania caffraria Steph. indigenous
Frullania capensis Gottsche, indigenous
Frullania depressa Mitt. indigenous
Frullania diptera (Lehm.) Drege, indigenous
Frullania ecklonii (Spreng.) Gottsche, Lindenb. & Nees, indigenous
Frullania eplicata Steph. indigenous
Frullania ericoides (Nees) Mont. indigenous
Frullania lindenbergii Lehm. indigenous
Frullania obscurifolia Mitt. indigenous
Frullania serrata Gottsche, indigenous
Frullania socotrana Mitt. indigenous
Frullania spongiosa Steph. indigenous
Frullania trinervis (Lehm.) Drege, indigenous
Frullania variegata Steph. indigenous
Frullanoides tristis (Steph.) Van Slageren, indigenous
Gongylanthus ericetorum (Raddi) Nees, indigenous
Gongylanthus renifolius (Mitt.) Steph. indigenous
Gongylanthus scariosus (Lehm.) Steph. indigenous
Gottschea sphagnoides (Schwagr.) Lindb. indigenous
Gymnocoleopsis capensis (S.W.Arnell) R.M.Schust. endemic
Gymnomitrion andinum (Herzog) Herzog, endemic
Gymnomitrion laceratum (Steph.) T.Horik. indigenous
Herbertus capensis (Steph.) Sim, indigenous
Herbertus dicranus (Taylor ex Gottsche et al.) Trevis. indigenous
Heteroscyphus dubius (Gottsche) Schiffn. indigenous
Hyalolepidozia bicuspidata (C.Massal.) S.W.Arnell ex Grolle, indigenous
Isotachis aubertii (Schwagr.) Mitt. indigenous
Jamesoniella colorata (Lehm.) Schiffn. indigenous
Jamesoniella grandiflora (Lindenb. & Gottsche) Steph. synonym
Jamesoniella oenops (Lindenb. & Gottsche) Steph. synonym
Jamesoniella paludosa Steph. synonym
Jamesoniella purpurascens Steph. indigenous
Jamesoniella rehmannii Steph. synonym
Jensenia spinosa (Lindenb. & Gottsche) Grolle, indigenous
Jungermannia austroafricana S.W.Arnell, synonym
Jungermannia borgenii Gottsche ex Pearson, indigenous
Jungermannia mildbraedii Steph. indigenous
Jungermannia pocsii Vana, indigenous
Jungermannia pumila With. indigenous
Jungermannia sphaerocarpa Hook. indigenous
Jungermannia stolonifera Steph. synonym
Kurzia capillaris (Sw.) Grolle, indigenous
Kurzia capillaris (Sw.) Grolle subsp. capillaris,
Kurzia irregularis (Steph.) Grolle, indigenous
Lejeunea brittoniae (A.Evans) Grolle, synonym
Lejeunea caespitosa Lindenb. indigenous
Lejeunea capensis Gottsche, indigenous
Lejeunea duncaniae (Sim) S.W.Arnell, endemic
Lejeunea eckloniana Lindenb. indigenous
Lejeunea helenae Pearson, indigenous
Lejeunea isophylla E.W.Jones, indigenous
Lejeunea phyllobola Nees & Mont. indigenous
Lejeunea rhodesiae (Sim) R.M.Schust. indigenous
Lejeunea tabularis (Spreng.) Gottsche, Lindenb. & Nees, indigenous
Lejeunea villaumei (Steph.) Grolle, indigenous
Lepicolea ochroleuca (Spreng.) Spruce, indigenous
Lepidozia cupressina (Sw.) Lindenb. indigenous
Lepidozia cupressina (Sw.) Lindenb. subsp. cupressina, indigenous
Lepidozia cupressina (Sw.) Lindenb. subsp. natalensis (Steph.) Pocs, indigenous
Lepidozia pearsonii Spruce, indigenous
Lepidozia stuhlmannia Steph. indigenous
Lepidozia stuhlmannia Steph. subsp. stuhlmannia, indigenous
Leptocolea cristata (Steph.) E.W.Jones, synonym
Leptoscyphus diversifolius (Gottsche) Grolle, endemic
Leptoscyphus expansus (Lehm.) Grolle, indigenous
Leptoscyphus iversenii (Pearson) Sim, synonym
Lethocolea congesta (Lehm.) S.W.Arnell, indigenous
Leucolejeunea rotundistipula (Lindenb. ex Lehm.) A.Evans, indigenous
Leucolejeunea unciloba (Lindenb.) A.Evans, indigenous
Leucolejeunea xanthocarpa (Lehm. & Lindenb.) A.Evans, indigenous
Lophocolea bewsii (Sim) Grolle, indigenous
Lophocolea bidentata (L.) Dumort. indigenous
Lophocolea concreta Mont. indigenous
Lophocolea difformis Nees, indigenous
Lophocolea fragrans (Moris & De Not.) Gottsche, Lindenb. & Nees, indigenous
Lophocolea lucida (Spreng. ex Lehm.) Mont. indigenous
Lophocolea martiana Nees, indigenous
Lophocolea muricata (Lehm.) Nees, indigenous
Lophocolea semiteres (Lehm.) Mitt. indigenous
Lopholejeunea fragilis Steph. synonym
Lopholejeunea nigricans (Lindenb.) Schiffn. indigenous
Lopholejeunea subfusca (Nees) Schiffn. indigenous
Lophozia argentina (Steph.) R.M.Schust. indigenous
Lophozia capensis S.W.Arnell, synonym
Lophozia montaguensis S.W.Arnell, synonym
Lunularia cruciata (L.) Dumort. ex Lindb. indigenous
Mannia capensis (Steph.) S.W.Arnell, indigenous
Marchantia berteroana Lehm. & Lindenb. indigenous
Marchantia debilis K.I.Goebel, indigenous
Marchantia paleacea Bertol. indigenous
Marchantia pappeana Lehm. indigenous
Marchantia pappeana Lehm. subsp. pappeana, indigenous
Marchantia polymorpha L. subsp. ruderalis Bischl. & Boissel.
Marchantia wilmsii Steph. synonym
Marsupella capensis S.W.Arnell, synonym
Marsupella sparsifolia (Lindb.) Dumort. indigenous
Marsupidium brevifolium Steph. synonym
Marsupidium limbatum (Steph.) Grolle, indigenous
Metzgeria africana Steph. synonym
Metzgeria agnewiae Kuwah. synonym
Metzgeria australis Steph. synonym
Metzgeria consanguinea Schiffn. indigenous
Metzgeria decipiens (C.Massal.) Schiffn. synonym
Metzgeria elliotii Steph. synonym
Metzgeria furcata (L.) Dumort. indigenous
Metzgeria leptoneura Spruce, indigenous
Metzgeria limbato-setosa Steph. synonym
Metzgeria madagassa Steph. indigenous
Metzgeria nicomariei Veltman & Potgieter, synonym
Metzgeria nudifrons Steph. indigenous
Metzgeria perrotana Steph. synonym
Metzgeria saxbyi Pearson, indigenous
Metzgeria tabularis Steph. synonym
Metzgeria violacea (Ach.) Dumort. indigenous
Microlejeunea africana Steph. indigenous
Mnioloma fuscum (Lehm.) R.M.Schust. indigenous
Monocarpus sphaerocarpus D.J.Carr indigenous
Notoscyphus belangerianus (Lehm. & Lindenb.) Mitt. synonym
Notoscyphus jackii (Steph.) Steph. synonym
Notoscyphus lutescens (Lehm. & Lindenb.) Mitt. indigenous
Odontoschisma africanum (Pearson) Sim, indigenous
Oxymitra cristata Garside ex Perold, indigenous
Pallavicinia lyellii (Hook.) Carruth. indigenous
Paracromastigum succulentum (Sim) J.J.Engel & G.L.S.Merr. endemic
Phragmilejeunea molleri (Steph.) R.M.Schust. synonym
Phragmilejeunea pappeana (Nees) R.M.Schust. synonym
Plagiochasma appendiculatum Lehm. & Lindenb. indigenous
Plagiochasma beccarianum Steph. indigenous
Plagiochasma eximium (Schiffn.) Steph. indigenous
Plagiochasma microcephalum (Steph.) Steph. indigenous
Plagiochasma microcephalum (Steph.) Steph. var. microcephalum, indigenous
Plagiochasma rupestre (J.R.Forst. & G.Forst.) Steph. indigenous
Plagiochasma rupestre (J.R.Forst. & G.Forst.) Steph. var. rupestre, indigenous
Plagiochasma rupestre (J.R.Forst. & G.Forst.) Steph. var. volkii Bischl. indigenous
Plagiochila exigua (Taylor) Taylor, indigenous
Plagiochila haumannii Herzog, indigenous
Plagiochila heterostipa Steph. indigenous
Plagiochila injasutiensis S.W.Arnell, indigenous
Plagiochila lastii Mitt. indigenous
Plagiochila lunata S.W.Arnell, indigenous
Plagiochila pseudoattenuata S.W.Arnell, indigenous
Plagiochila sarmentosa (Lehm. & Lindenb.) Lindenb. endemic
Plagiochila squamulosa Mitt. indigenous
Plagiochila squamulosa Mitt. var. crispulo-caudata (Gottsche) Vanden Berghen, indigenous
Plagiochila terebrans Nees & Mont. ex Lindenb. indigenous
Plagiochila wilmsiana Steph. endemic
Plicanthus hirtellus (F.Weber) R.M.Schust. indigenous
Porella abyssinica (Nees) Trevis. indigenous
Porella abyssinica (Nees) Trevis. var. hoehnelii (Steph.) Pocs, indigenous
Porella capensis (Gottsche) Steph. indigenous
Porella hoehnelii Steph. synonym
Porella vallis-gratiae (Gottsche) S.W.Arnell, indigenous
Psiloclada clandestina Mitt. endemic
Ptychanthus striatus (Lehm. & Lindenb.) Nees, indigenous
Radula ankefinensis Gottsche, indigenous
Radula boryana (F.Weber) Mont. indigenous
Radula fulvifolia (Hook.f. & Taylor) Gottsche, Lindenb. & Nees, indigenous
Radula holstiana Steph. synonym
Radula lindenbergiana Gottsche ex C.Hartm. indigenous
Radula quadrata Gottsche, indigenous
Radula recurvifolia Steph. synonym
Radula stenocalyx Mont. indigenous
Radula stipatiflora Steph. synonym
Radula tabularis Steph. endemic
Radula voluta Taylor ex Gottsche, Lindenb. & Nees, indigenous
Rectolejeunea brittonae A.Evans, synonym
Riccardia amazonica (Spruce) Schiffn. ex Gradst. & Hekking, indigenous
Riccardia capensis S.W.Arnell, endemic
Riccardia compacta (Steph.) S.W.Arnell, indigenous
Riccardia fastigiata (Lehm.) Trevis. indigenous
Riccardia limbata (Steph.) E.W.Jones, indigenous
Riccardia multifida (L.) Gray, indigenous
Riccardia obtusa S.W.Arnell, endemic
Riccardia saccatiflora (Steph.) S.W.Arnell, synonym
Riccardia stephanii (Besch. ex Steph.) E.W.Jones, synonym
Riccia alatospora O.H.Volk & Perold, endemic
Riccia albolimbata S.W.Arnell, indigenous
Riccia albomarginata Bisch. endemic
Riccia alboporosa Perold, endemic
Riccia albornata O.H.Volk & Perold, endemic
Riccia albovestita O.H.Volk, indigenous
Riccia ampullacea Perold, indigenous
Riccia angolensis Steph. indigenous
Riccia argenteolimbata O.H.Volk & Perold, indigenous
Riccia atropurpurea Sim, indigenous
Riccia bicolorata Perold, endemic
Riccia bullosa Link ex Lindenb. indigenous
Riccia cavernosa Hoffm. indigenous
Riccia compacta Garside, endemic
Riccia concava Bisch. endemic
Riccia congoana Steph. indigenous
Riccia crinita Taylor, indigenous
Riccia crozalsii Levier, indigenous
Riccia crystallina L. indigenous
Riccia cupulifera A.V.Duthie, endemic
Riccia curtisii (James ex Austin) Austin, indigenous
Riccia elongata Perold, endemic
Riccia furfuracea Perold, endemic
Riccia garsidei Sim, endemic
Riccia hantamensis Perold, endemic
Riccia hirsuta O.H.Volk & Perold, endemic
Riccia lanceolata Steph. indigenous
Riccia limbata Bisch. endemic
Riccia macrocarpa Levier, indigenous
Riccia mammifera O.H.Volk & Perold, endemic
Riccia mamrensis Perold, endemic
Riccia microciliata O.H.Volk & Perold, indigenous
Riccia moenkemeyeri Steph. indigenous
Riccia montana Perold, indigenous
Riccia namaquensis Perold, endemic
Riccia natalensis Sim, endemic
Riccia nigrella DC. indigenous
Riccia okahandjana S.W.Arnell, indigenous
Riccia parvoareolata O.H.Volk & Perold, endemic
Riccia pottsiana Sim, endemic
Riccia pulveracea Perold, endemic
Riccia purpurascens Lehm. endemic
Riccia radiata Perold, endemic
Riccia rosea O.H.Volk & Perold, indigenous
Riccia rubricollis Garside & A.V.Duthie ex Perold, endemic
Riccia runssorensis Steph. indigenous
Riccia schelpei O.H.Volk & Perold, endemic
Riccia sibayenii Perold, endemic
Riccia simii Perold, indigenous
Riccia sorocarpa Bisch. indigenous
Riccia stricta (Lindenb.) Perold, indigenous
Riccia tomentosa O.H.Volk & Perold, endemic
Riccia trichocarpa M.Howe, synonym
Riccia villosa Steph. endemic
Riccia vitrea Perold, endemic
Riccia volkii S.W.Arnell, indigenous
Ricciocarpos natans (L.) Corda, indigenous
Riella affinis M.Howe & Underw. indigenous
Riella alatospora Wigglesw. endemic
Riella capensis Cavers, endemic
Riella echinospora Wigglesw. indigenous
Riella purpureospora Wigglesw. endemic
Scapania cuspiduligera (Nees) Mull.Frib. indigenous
Schiffneriolejeunea pappeana (Nees) Gradst. indigenous
Schiffneriolejeunea pappeana (Nees) Gradst. var. pappeana, indigenous
Schiffneriolejeunea polycarpa (Nees) Gradst. indigenous
Schistochila alata (Lehm.) Schiffn. indigenous
Schistochila sphagnoides (Schwagr.) Steph. synonym
Sphaerocarpos stipitatus Bisch. ex Lindenb. indigenous
Stephaniella paraphyllina Jack, indigenous
Strepsilejeunea georgensis S.W.Arnell, synonym
Symphyogyna brasiliensis Nees & Mont. indigenous
Symphyogyna podophylla (Thunb.) Nees & Mont. indigenous
Targionia hypophylla L. indigenous
Targionia hypophylla L. var. capensis Huebener, indigenous
Taxilejeunea conformis (Nees & Mont.) Steph. indigenous
Taxilejeunea vallis-gratiae Steph. indigenous
Telaranea redacta (Steph.) J.J.Engel & G.L.S.Merr. indigenous
Telaranea succulenta (Sim) Grolle, synonym
Thysananthus africanus (Sim) S.W.Arnell, synonym
Trachyphyllum dusenii (Mull.Hal. ex Broth.) Broth. indigenous
Trachyphyllum gastrodes (Welw. & Duby) A.Gepp, indigenous
Trachyphyllum inflexum (Harv.) A.Gepp, indigenous
Tritomaria exsecta (Schmidel) Loeske, indigenous
Tylimanthus africanus Pearson, endemic
Tylimanthus wilmsii Steph. synonym

See also

References

South African plant biodiversity lists
Liverworts